Centenary Methodist Church may refer to:

Centenary Methodist Episcopal Church, South, St. Louis, MO, listed on the NRHP in Missouri
 Centenary Methodist Church (New Bern, North Carolina), listed on the NRHP in North Carolina
 Centenary Methodist Church (Rowland, North Carolina), listed on the NRHP in North Carolina
Centenary Methodist Church (Charleston, South Carolina), historic 1842 classical architecture church designed by Edward Brickell White
Centenary Methodist Church, York, former name of the main Methodist church in York in England